The AVIA FL.3 (also later known as the Lombardi FL.3) was an Italian two-seat cabin monoplane designed and built by Azionaria Vercellese Industrie Aeronautiche (AVIA) who were later taken over by Lombardi in 1947.

Development
The FL.3 was a simple low-wing cantilever monoplane with fixed landing gear and powered by an 85 hp (63 kW) Continental C-85 engine. It had room for a pilot and passenger sitting side-by-side and could either have an open or enclosed cockpit. The first aircraft flew in 1939 and production was started, but ended temporarily when the Second World War started.

Production resumed after the war and in 1947 the company was taken over by Lombardi. Over 700 aircraft had been built by AVIA and Lombardi when production stopped in 1948.

In 1953 Meteor SpA acquired the rights for the FL.3 and with some re-design produced it as the Meteor FL.53 and this was followed by a three-seat version the FL.54 powered by a 135 hp Lycoming engine. A four-seat version the FL.55 was also produced powered by either a 150 hp (112 kW) or 180 hp (134 kW) Lycoming engine.

Variants
AVIA FL.3
Production version by AVIA powered by a 60 hp (45 kW) CNA D.4 engine.
Lombardi FL.3
Production version by Lombardi.
Meteor FL.53
Modified version built by Meteor powered by a 65 hp (48 kW) Continental engine, eight built.
Meteor FL.53BM
FL.53 with a 90 hp (67 kW) Continental engine, four built.

Meteor FL.54
Three-seat variant powered by a 90 hp (67 kW) Continental C90-12F engine, 10 built by Meteor.
Meteor FL.55
Four-seat variant powered by 135 hp (100 kW) Lycoming engine, four built by Meteor.
Meteor FL.55BM
FL.55 powered by a 150 hp (112 kW) Lycoming engine, ten built by Meteor.
Meteor FL.55CM
FL.55 powered by a 180 hp (130 kW) Lycoming engine, one built by Meteor.
Meteor Super
The Super was a four-seat FL.55 with enlarged vertical tail and a 220 hp Meteor Alfa 4 engine, one built.
Meteor Bis
The Bis was a two-seat variant of the Super fitted with a 110 hp Meteor Alfa 2 engine.

Operators

Zrakoplovstvo Nezavisne Države Hrvatske

Luftwaffe operated captured aircraft.

Regia Aeronautica
Italian Co-Belligerent Air Force

Aeronautica Nazionale Repubblicana

Italian Air Force

Specifications (FL.3)

See also

References

 The Illustrated Encyclopedia of Aircraft (Part Work 1982-1985), 1985, Orbis Publishing, Page 2380

External links

 World Aircraft Directory
 Gruppo Amici Velivoli Storici
Photo gallery on airliners.net

Lombardi aircraft
1930s Italian civil utility aircraft
Low-wing aircraft
Single-engined tractor aircraft
Aircraft first flown in 1939